Department of Ex-servicemen Welfare (Poorva Senani Kalyan Vibhag) is a department in the Ministry of Defence, India. It was set up in 2004.    The head of Department of Ex-servicemen Welfare since its inception has been  a bureaucrat from the IAS.   Veteran  have for long demanded   that DEWS  be headed by a serving officers  or  a retired officer,  like in other countries, including  the  United States, in which the  Department of Veterans,  is invariably headed by  veteran with  active duty  military experience, with a cabinet rank.  For instance the  current head of the department is graduate of West Point, and has served in the army.

Functions and Organization
The functions of DESW  according to the official website are: "Matters relating to Armed Forces Veterans (Ex- Servicemen) including pensioners;Armed Forces Veterans (ExServicemen); Contributory Health Scheme;  Matters relating to Directorate General of Resettlement and Kendriya Sainik Board; Administration of (a) the Pension Regulations for the Army, 1961 (Parts I and II); (b)the Pension Regulations for the Air Force, 1961 (Parts I and II);(c)the Navy (Pension) Regulations, 1964; and(d) The Entitlement Rules to Casualty Pensionary Awards to the Armed Forces Personnel, 1982".

The  department  has two Divisions,  the Resettlement Division and the Pension Division and 3 attached offices namely (a) Secretariat of Kendriya Sainik Board (KSB), (b) Directorate General (Resettlement) (DGR) and (c) Ex-servicemen Contributory Health Scheme (ECHS) Organisation.

Veterans in India 
There are  about 2.6 million ex-servicemen, and 60,000 widows, including war widows, i.e., a combined total of 3.2 million, of whom  about 86 percent are widows, Junior Commissioned Officers, Non Commissioned Officers , and other ranks, and  about 14 percent are officers.

Most  are in  age bracket  of 35 to 45 years. Directorate  General  Resettlement (DGR) is responsible      for   preparing      retiring/      retired  service  personnel  for  a  second  career. Veterans   in India in the last decade   have  resorted to  public protest  under the OROP banner to  highlight   that they are uncared for and  treated far worse than civilian counterparts.

DEWS and Veterans

DEWS Response to Veteran Issues
Four former heads of the Armed Forces in August 2015, in an open letter  addressed  to the President of India flagged "The hostile approach of MoD bureaucracy" and its "antagonistic handling of problems related to pensions and allowances of aging veterans, war widows and battle-casualties'.

DEWS opposes One Rank   One   Pension   (OROP) 
The  Department of Ex-servicemen Welfare has  opposed  One Rank One Pension  OROP. In 2011,  Neelam Nath,   Secretary  of Department of Ex-Servicemen Welfare  from June 1, 2009 to September 30, 2011,   in her deposition in front of the Parliamentary Panel  that examined the grant of OROP to the Armed Forces,   opposed the grant and implementation of OROP for the Armed Forces.

On  February 17, 2014,   despite protest of  DESW,  the Government  announced in  the  interim  budget acceptance  of  the  principle of ‘One Rank One Pension  (OROP),  and   Ministry of Defence Report 2013-14,  noted that "Government  has  taken  steps  to  implement the OROP from the financial  year  2014-15" and that the implementation will improve pensions of  past pensioners . Despite the announcement in the MOD Report, OROP  was not implemented.  The failure to implement  OROP  by the BJP Government which had in its election manifesto pledged to do so  provoked nationwide protest by ex servicemen.

Failure of the  BJP Government to implement OROP after several promises provoked Ex-servicemen  to undertake unprecedented nationwide protests, and hunger strikes  from  15 June 2015. Veteran protest have  had the support of former heads of armed Forces. Four former chiefs of the Armed Forces of India, namely General S F Rodrigues, former COAS, and Admirals L Ramdas, Arun Prakash and Sureesh Mehta, former Chiefs of Naval Staff, in an open letter to President Pranab Mukherjee, Supreme Commander of the Armed Forces, on 13 August 2015, warned that the  denigration and humiliation of veterans, and the Government  handling  of  veterans  and armed Forces issues,  pose grave "implication for national security"

National Commission for Ex-Servicemen
Following persistent demand by Ex servicemen, the Government  on 9 June 2014  announces  that it will set up  a  National Commission for Ex-Servicemen.  However, no funds are earmarked  for  setting up of the commission during the year 2014–15.

See also
One Rank, One Pension
Indian Ex Servicemen Movement
Koshyari Committee Report On Grant Of One Rank One Pension

References

External links
 Department of Ex-Servicemen Welfare Performance
 Directorate of Indian Army Veterans (DIAV) 

Ministry of Defence (India)
Veterans' affairs in India